The Basel–Aesch railway line is a  railway line in Switzerland. It runs  from Aesch to the border of Basel-Stadt, near , where it connects with the Basel tram network.

History 
 opened a line between Ruchfeld, in Basel, and Aesch, on 7 December 1907. The line was electrified from opening at 550 V DC, later increased to 600 V DC. In 1974, Trambahn Basel-Aesch merged with three other companies to form Baselland Transport, which continues to own and operate the line.

Route 
The line begins from a turning loop on the Haupstrasse, in Aesch. The line runs north-south, through the municipalities of Reinach and Münchenstein. Near Dreispitz, at the northern end of the line, it joins with the Basel–Dornach railway line. The two lines then connect with the tracks of the Basel tram network.

Operation 
Baselland Transport operates the line as a tramway, designated as Line 11 of the Basel tram network. Two trams operate every fifteen minutes from Aesch to Saint-Louis via . This is supplemented by the E11 line, which provides weekday rush-hour service to and from Reinach and the Basel city center.

Notes

References 
 

Railway lines in Switzerland
Railway lines opened in 1907
1907 establishments in Switzerland
Baselland Transport lines
Metre gauge railways in Switzerland
600 V DC railway electrification